Archie David Kao (born December 14, 1969) is an American actor and producer.  He is best known to American audiences for series regulars roles on Chicago P.D., Power Rangers Lost Galaxy as well as long-running hit CSI: Crime Scene Investigation.

Early life

Born in Washington, D.C., Kao grew up in the suburbs of Alexandria, Virginia. His parents are immigrants from Taiwan.

While attending George Mason University, Kao joined the Sigma Chi fraternity and graduated with a degree in Speech Communication.

As an undergraduate, Kao was elected Student Government President as well as the University's Homecoming King. He initially had plans to attend Law School and work in politics before becoming an actor.

Kao also speaks and understands Mandarin Chinese because he grew up in a bilingual household with two younger sisters but is more comfortable speaking in English, especially in interviews. He also studied French for six years.

He was named one of Peoples "Hottest Bachelors" in 2006. Kao currently divides his time between Los Angeles and Beijing.

Career

Television 
Through the early 2000s, Kao may have been best known for his role as Archie Johnson in the hit television series CSI: Crime Scene Investigation, as well as the role of Kai Chen, the Blue Ranger, in Power Rangers Lost Galaxy. He has also appeared on TV shows such as Desperate Housewives (as Steve), ER (as Yuri), NBC's Heroes, Century City, Huff (as Kane), Power Rangers Wild Force (as General Venjix), Once and Again (as Steven), L.A. Firefighters (as Peter), Maybe This Time (as Takeshi) and more.

In 2013, Kao joined the cast of the NBC TV series Chicago P.D. (a spin-off from Chicago Fire) as a series regular, a character named Detective Sheldon Jin who is in charge of surveillance at the Chicago Police Department Intelligence Unit.

Kao shares his birthday with fellow Power Rangers actress Thuy Trang (1973–2001), who played the original Yellow Ranger, Trini Kwan, in Mighty Morphin Power Rangers from 1993 to 1994.

Film 

Kao appeared as Sebastian in Wayne Wang's Snow Flower and the Secret Fan, and starred as the main romantic lead, Jefferson, in Quentin Lee's The People I've Slept With. Kao also played Edwin Luke, the brother of Keye Luke in Timothy Tau's short film bio-pic Keye Luke, which premiered at the 2012 Los Angeles Asian Pacific Film Festival and which was Closing Night Film of the inaugural 2013 Seattle Asian American Film Festival. Kao has recently signed on to a thriller film from China entitled The Deathday Party opposite Anita Yuen, which is also being shot in the ancient Chinese Alu Caves of Yunan. Kao played Shum in Michael Mann's film Blackhat (2015). Kao has also had roles in films such as The Hills Have Eyes 2 (as Han), Nomad: The Warrior (as Shangrek), When In Rome (as Nobu), and Jet Li's The One (as Woo).

Kao provided the voice of Kenji in the videogame Need for Speed: Carbon.

Kao wrote, directed and produced a short film entitled Initiation (2011), which starred Ashley Bell and Kao's CSI co-star Marc Vann. The film is about an assassin trainee (Bell) who struggles with initiation day jitters under her mentor (Vann). Kao also produced and starred in a short film (as Jin) directed by Jerry Chan entitled Fast Money (2006).

Personal life
In May 2014, Chinese actress Zhou Xun posted a picture of Archie and herself on her team's Weibo account, announcing that they were dating.

On July 16, 2014, Kao and Zhou were officially married on stage after a charity event in Hangzhou, China.

On December 23, 2020, Zhou announced on her Sina Weibo account that they have divorced, to which Kao acknowledged a comment to her update.

Filmography

Film

Television

References

External links

10 Things You Didn't Know about Archie Kao
Kao on about.me

Archie Kao: Jack of All Trades | Taipei 543
Zhou Xun and Archie Kao Wed in Surprise Public Ceremony in China

20th-century American male actors
21st-century American male actors
American male actors of Chinese descent
American male actors of Taiwanese descent
American male film actors
American male television actors
American male voice actors
American people of Taiwanese descent
George Mason University alumni
Living people
Male actors from Los Angeles
Male actors from Washington, D.C.
Male actors from Alexandria, Virginia
1969 births